Alessandro Turrin (born 10 March 1997) is an Italian football player.

Club career
He made his Serie C debut for Forlì on 27 August 2016 in a game against Venezia.

On 29 June 2018, he moved on a season-long loan to Virtus Francavilla. On 10 January 2019, he moved on another loan at Imolese.

References

External links
 

1997 births
People from the Province of Pordenone
Living people
Italian footballers
Atalanta B.C. players
Forlì F.C. players
Reggina 1914 players
Virtus Francavilla Calcio players
Imolese Calcio 1919 players
Serie C players
Association football goalkeepers
Footballers from Friuli Venezia Giulia